Chacon was a  commercial vessel built in Tacoma Washington by Johnson and Waughbo in 1918. Built for service in Ketchikan Alaska as a cannery tender and tug boat, Chacon was powered by an 85 hp Frisco Standard gasoline engine. 

Chacon was originally owned by the Sawyer and McKay Company, owners of several fish traps near Ketchikan. Chacon was later sold to Ed J. Williams  and operated as a mail and passenger boat. On April 13, 1937, Chacon was lost at sea in a gale at Cape Mudge. Her crew of six were rescued.

References

Further reading 
 [https://books.google.com/books?id=tHNaAAAAYAAJ&dq=chacon+cannery+tender&pg=RA3-PA106  Advertisement from 1919 issue of Pacific Motor Boat Magazine shows a picture of Chacon.

Merchant ships of the United States
Shipwrecks of the British Columbia coast